Sołtysy  is a village in the administrative district of Gmina Gielniów, within Przysucha County, Masovian Voivodeship, in east-central Poland.

The village has a population of 200.

References

Villages in Przysucha County